RISK (born Kelly Graval), also known as RISKY, is a Los Angeles-based graffiti artist and fashion entrepreneur. In the 1980s, he was one of the first graffiti writers in Southern California to paint freight trains, and he pioneered writing on "heavens", or freeway overpasses. He took his graffiti into the gallery with the launch of the Third Rail series of art shows, and later created a line of graffiti-inspired clothing.

Biography
Born to a Jewish family and raised in Louisiana, Graval moved with his family to Los Angeles in 1983 where he enrolled at University High School on the city's west side. 

In 2019, Risk painted the largest public mural in Canada, at the disused St. Joseph's Health Centre site of Health Sciences North in Greater Sudbury, Ontario, as part of the city's Up Here Festival.

Publications 

 Gastman, Roger. "Freight Train Graffiti." New York: Abrams, 2006.
 Alva, Robert. "The History of Los Angeles Graffiti Art." Alva & Reiling Publications, 2005.
 Grody, Steve. "Graffiti L.A." New York: Abrams, 2006.

References 

American graffiti artists
Jewish American artists
Living people
Year of birth missing (living people)
People from Louisiana
21st-century American Jews